Deathstalker and the Warriors from Hell, also known as Deathstalker III: The Warriors from Hell, is a 1988 sword and sorcery fantasy film. It is the third film in the Deathstalker tetralogy.

Plot summary
The film, which takes place in a fantasy setting, opens at a festival featuring Deathstalker and the wizard Nicias. Deathstalker once saved Nicias and the two go from village to village obtaining money by Nicias foretelling the future and showing his magic. During the festival, a hooded woman arrives to see Nicias. She is actually the princess Carissa bringing a magical stone hoping that Nicias has the other one, which when united, will at long last uncover the magical and rich city of Arandor of whom Nicias is the last of the city's descendants. Nicias does not possess the second stone, but knows it is south in Southland which is ruled by the evil sorcerer Troxartes. Troxartes has the second stone and wants the first so he can harness its power and rule more.

The festival is attacked by Troxartes's black-clad right-hand man Makut and his horse soldiers looking for the stone. Amid the slaughter and chaos, Nicias teleports away while the princess is saved from capture by Deathstalker and the two escape. She is nonetheless killed by a few of the unknowing soldiers and passes the stone and knowledge on to Deathstalker. He travels to the hot and wooded Southland where he meets the twin sister of Carissa, the feisty Princess Elizena who was sent from the North to marry Troxartes. Makut is searching for Deathstalker now and finds him again so Deathstalker hides in Elizena's tent but is alerted by her after she sees he held her with a twig instead of a knife. He escapes into an impenetrable valley where he is given shelter by two wild women, Marinda and her mother. Marinda has sex with Deathstalker and then leads him to their horses so he can escape since Makut has entered the valley. The mother, outraged at Marinda's absence, leads Makut to the horses, but Deathstalker has escaped. Learning that he is up against Deathstalker, Troxartes uses his power to awaken all the dead foes he defeated to catch the “legend.”

Elizena's guards were killed by Makut after he thought they were aiding Deathstalker. She accidentally meets Deathstalker who is camping in the woods. In the morning she leaves and is found by Troxartes who takes her back to his castle as his bride. Deathstalker trails them and infiltrates the castle by night, but is found by Troxartes himself who asks for the stone until Deathstalker is knocked unconscious and the stone retrieved. Troxartes figures out there is actually a third stone needed to harness the power so he puts his mistress to torture Deathstalker for the knowledge, but he escapes and ties her up. Heading for the stones, Nicias unknowingly teleports right near Troxartes in the castle who jovially captures him and intends to put him in his army if his magic cannot find the third stone.

In the woods at night, Deathstalker finds Marinda and runs into a few of the undead warriors near a campfire recognizing Gragas who was killed in a fair fight between Deathstalker earlier. They are forced to do Troxartes's bidding because their souls are kept secure in jars so Deathstalker makes a deal to get the jars if they will help him against Troxartes. He also tells Marinda to go alert the northern band to come help in the fight against the castle. Elizena learns she is just being kept alive until the third stone is found so she leads Deathstalker to where Nicias is being kept. The third stone is accidentally discovered to have been hidden in the castle all along. The northern band arrives and the souls are released by Deathstalker so the undead warriors turn on Troxartes and his band. In the ensuing battle, Makut is killed by an arrow during a duel with Deathstalker. Troxartes kills Marinda and is then killed by Deathstalker during the fight. The three stones are united at last and it reveals the secret city of Arandor and peace is brought to the land. Deathstalker rides off into the sunset for further adventures.

Cast 
John Allen Nelson as Deathstalker
Carla Herd as Carissa / Elizena
Terri Treas as Camisarde
Thom Christopher as Troxartas
Aarón Hernán as Nicias
Roger Cudney as Inaros
Agustín Salvat as Makut
Claudia Inchaurregui as Marinda
Mario Iván Martínez as Preacher
Carlos Romano as Gragas
Erika Carlsson as Khorsa
Alejandro Bracho as Dead Warrior
Lizetta Romo as Dead Warrior
Antonio Zubiaga as Soldier
Manuel Benítez as Soldier

Production 
The movie borrows footage from The Raven for some of the exterior shots of Troxartes's castle turrets.

Reception

Influence 
This movie appeared on the seventh season of Mystery Science Theater 3000. In the episode, Mike Nelson, Tom Servo, and Crow T. Robot mock lead actor John Allen Nelson's inability to maintain a consistent accent throughout the film, as well as his character's irritating cockiness that causes them to root against him for most of the movie. They also ridicule Makut's helmet, which has enormous metal bat wings welded on each side. Thom Christopher's physical appearance and poor line delivery in the film also prove to be fodder for several jokes. At one point, Tom Servo comments that he cannot take an "arch nemesis who's 5'8" and bald" seriously. The wizard Nicias prompts numerous jokes as well, primarily The Lord of the Rings comments that compare his appearance to Gandalf, Saruman, and Radagast the Brown.  The film's lame attempt at a battle scene prompted Nelson to say on two occasions, "This movie is like playing Doom when there's no monsters or opponents." and "This is one of the most ambitiously bad movies we have ever done."

The episode's stinger (following the end credits) is Marinda's mother angrily declaring "Potatoes are what we eat!"

The MST3K version of Deathstalker and the Warriors from Hell was included as part of the Mystery Science Theater 3000, Volume XXXV DVD collection, released by Shout! Factory on March 29, 2016. The other episodes in the four-disc set include Teenage Caveman (episode #315), Being from Another Planet (episode #405), and 12 to the Moon (episode #524).

Soundtrack
The movie's theme tune is a recycling of James Horner's theme for Roger Corman's Battle Beyond the Stars, which has been re-used by Corman himself for several of his films, including Space Raiders and Sorceress. The film also includes an excerpt of Brian Eno's "Prophecy Theme" from the soundtrack of the 1984 David Lynch version of Dune.

References

External links 

1988 films
1988 fantasy films
Sword and sorcery films
American fantasy adventure films
Deathstalker (film series)
1980s English-language films
1980s American films